Country Cricket New South Wales, is responsible for the development of cricket in regional New South Wales. It is under control of the governing body Cricket NSW.

Overview
Country Cricket New South Wales is an administrative organisation responsible for the promotion, development and organisation of cricket in regional New South Wales (i.e. all areas outside of the Sydney metropolitan area). It is divided into multiple zones. These are:

 Cricket ACT
 Barrier District Cricket League (Cricket in Broken Hill)
 Central Coast CA
 Central Northern Zone
 Illawarra CA
 Newcastle Cricket Zone
 North Coastal Zone
 Riverina Zone
 Southern Zone
 Western Zone

History
In country New South Wales, one of the earliest clubs was the Queanbeyan District Cricket Club, being officially formed in 1863 but having played games as a less formally structured club against teams from local towns through the 1850s.

Cricket was first played in the region now known as the Central Coast in 1858. With the Ourimbah (Blue Gum Flat) cricket club prevalent, and clubs at Gosford, Kincumber and Wyong joining in, social matches were played throughout the remainder of the 19th Century. Competitions were conducted and concluded in 1899-1900 and 1906-07. In 1911-12, the Narara Cricket Club entered the Newcastle District Cricket Association Senior Grade competition. Strengthened by a few players from other local clubs, the side won the competition, Arthur Brown from Jilliby scoring 243 not out in the final against Wickham. The Wyong District Cricket Association began regular and sustained competitions in 1912-13, and was joined by the Gosford DCA in 1920-21. The two ran in parallel for most of the next fifty years. The amalgamated GWDCA became the Central Coast Cricket Association early in the new millennium.

Competitions
Country Cricket NSW host's many tournaments for regional NSW. These include:

 Bradman Cup (U-16's)
 Country Championship
 Country Cup
 Country Colts
 Kookaburra Cup (U-14s)
 SCG Country Cup
 Under 17's

Grade Cricket Zones

Cricket ACT
Grade Clubs include:
 Australian National University Cricket Club
 Eastlake Cricket Club
 Ginninderra Cricket Club
 North Canberra Gunghalin Cricket Club
 Queanbeyan District Cricket Club
 Tuggeranong Valley Cricket Club
 Weston Creek Cricket Club
 Western District and University of Canberra Cricket Club

Source: Cricket ACT Clubs

Barrier D.C.L.
Grade Clubs include:
 Central Broken Hill
 North Broken Hill Cricket CLub
 South
 Warriors
 West

Source: Barrier DCL Clubs

Central Coast Cricket Association

Website: Central Coast CA

Source: Central Coast CA Clubs

See the List of NSW Central Coast Cricket First Grade Premiers

Central Northern Cricket
This zone comprises both the Hunter Valley Cricket Council and the Northern Inland Cricket Council

Illawarra Cricket Association
Website: Cricket Illawarra

Grade Clubs include:
 Balgownie
 Corrimal
 Dapto
 Helensburgh
 Keira
 Northern Districts
 Port Kembla
 University of Wollongong
 Wests Illawarra
 Wollongong District

Newcastle Cricket Zone
This zone comprises the Newcastle District Cricket Association and the Newcastle City and Suburban Cricket Association

North Coastal Zone
This zone encompasses the Far NSW North Coast, North Coast and Mid North Coast and comprises multiple councils and districts. These include:
 Far North Coast Cricket Council
 Ballina District CA
 Casino District CA
 Kyogle District CA
 Lismore District CA
 Tweed Heads District CA
 North Coast Cricket Council
 Clarence River CA
 Coffs Harbour District CA
 Lower Clarence CA
 Nambucca Valley CA
 Mid North Coast Cricket Council
 Hastings River District CA
 Macleay Valley CA
 Manning River District CA

Riverina Zone
This zone is divided into three councils of multiple districts:
 Murrumbidgee Cricket Council
 Ardlethan Barellan CA
 Griffith DCA
 Hillston DCA
 Lake Cargelligo DCA
 Leeton DCA
 West Wyalong DCA
 Northern Riverina Cricket Council
 Cootamundra DCA
 Gundagai DCA
 Temora DCA
 Tumut DCA
 Wagga Wagga DCA
 Yass DCA
 Southern Riverina Cricket Council
 Murray Valley DCA
 Deniliquin DCA
 Capaspe DCA (Victoria)
 Northern Districts CA (Victoria)

Southern Zone
Website: Southern Zone

This zone is divided into eight districts. These are:
 Eurobodalla DCA
 Far South Coast
 Crookwell DCA
 Goulburn DCA
 Highlands DCA
 Monaro DCA
 Shoalhaven DCA
 South Coast DCA

Western Zone
Website: Western Zone

This zone is divided into 3 Councils covering multiple districts:

Lachlan Cricket Council
 Condobolin DCA
 Cowra DCA
 Forbes DCA
 Parkes DCA

Macquarie Valley Cricket Council
 Bourke DCA
 Cobar DCA
 Dubbo DCA
 Gilgandra DCA
 Narromine DCA
 Nyngan DCA
 Walgett DCA
 Warren DCA
 Wellington DCA

Central West Cricket Council
 Bathurst DCA
 Blue Mountains DCA
 Gulgong DCA
 Lithgow DCA
 Molong DCA
 Mudgee DCA
 Orange DCA

Honours

Country Cricket NSW Staff

Administration

 CEO: TBC
 Country Cricket Coordinator: Bruce Whitehouse

Regional Cricket Staff

 Central North RCM: Matthew Walter
 Illawarra Southern RCM: Paul Brockley
 Newcastle Central Coast RCM: Francis Walsh
 North Coast RCM: Lawrence Murphy
 Riverina RCM: Robbie Mackinlay
 Western RCM: Matthew Tabbernor

See also

Cricket in New South Wales
Cricket NSW

References

External links

Cricket NSW official website

Sports governing bodies in New South Wales
Sports governing bodies in the Australian Capital Territory
Cricket in New South Wales

fr:Cricket Australia
hi:क्रिकेट ऑस्ट्रेलिया